Joan Laporta Estruch (born 29 June 1962) is a Spanish politician and current president of FC Barcelona.

Laporta is a lawyer (he graduated from the University of Barcelona) with his own firm, Laporta & Arbós, which has a number of notable Spanish firms as clients. He served as MP in the Parliament of Catalonia between 2010 and 2012.

During his first tenure as president of FC Barcelona, they set a new record for trophies won in a 12-month period, winning 6 in 2009. After departing in 2010, he was re-elected as club president in 2021.

Career at FC Barcelona 

Laporta started his involvement with FC Barcelona leading the "Elefant Blau" ("Blue Elephant"), a group which opposed former president Josep Lluís Núñez and which, in 1998, tried unsuccessfully a vote of no confidence against him.

2003–2010: First tenure as club president

First season in charge 

In the 2003 elections, Laporta did not start as the favourite, but his charisma grew during the electoral campaign and he finally won against the expected victor, publicist Lluís Bassat, in part because of a widely published (and ultimately unfulfilled) promise to bring David Beckham to Barcelona. Laporta had the support of other young businessmen of Barcelona, such as Sandro Rosell. Laporta quickly became a media star, even more than some of the players.

Laporta's first season (2003–04) as president would prove to be a watershed for the club, but not without initial instability. The club situation was one of bitter unhappiness and disappointment amongst both fans and players after the club failed to meet their own standards to match Real Madrid's success in the early 2000s, having not won trophies since 1999.

Arrival of Frank Rijkaard 

With the Laporta's arrival, and that of football superstar Ronaldinho (his star signing after David Beckham's decision to go to Real Madrid, and Thierry Henry who decided to remain at Arsenal) as well as new manager Frank Rijkaard, among others, the club was forced to embark on a new phase, having elected a new, young and largely untested managerial board along with him. Laporta also decided to fight against the threat of violence outside the Camp Nou stadium, specially from the Boixos Nois (Mad Boys) ultras gang, and faced insults and death threats from them. Police investigation revealed they had planned to kidnap him. To exacerbate the situation, the 2003–04 season began abysmally results-wise, with Laporta constantly having to call for the fans' understanding and patience with him and Rijkaard as the club slowly phased out underachieving players from the old guard in order to rebuild a new-look side around Ronaldinho.

Laporta also had to spur his board to foster creative business ideas to raise revenue, and in recent years, that new style of management eventually succeeded in turning around the fortunes of the club with the team spectacularly returning to form and finishing second after being at the bottom of the table in 2003–04, and then finally managing to win La Liga titles both in 2004–05 and in 2005–06. During this period, the inherited massive financial debt started to be cut down, and only two players remained from the original team that did not win a major title in six years, with players like Deco, Samuel Eto'o and Edmílson as the new starlets, around Ronaldinho and a core of home-grown players like Carles Puyol, Xavi, Andrés Iniesta, Víctor Valdés and Oleguer. The club finally won the UEFA Champions League on 17 May 2006, only their second time in history, as well as that year's Liga championship.

Barcelona had a long history of avoiding shirt sponsors. In 2006, FC Barcelona announced a five-year agreement with UNICEF, where the club would donate €1.5 million and the UNICEF logo would feature on their shirts. After Laporta left as president, the club signed shirt sponsorships with Qatar Foundation and later Qatar Airways, which he criticised.

Re-election as club president 

There was some discussion about when exactly Laporta's mandate started, with the board of directors holding one opinion and the opposition another. One club member went to the court and, on 19 July 2006, a judge ruled that the first eight days of his presidency in June 2003 counted as the first year of his four-year term; his term had therefore expired and new elections were called. Temporarily, the club was ruled by a management committee led by the economist Xavier Sala-i-Martin.

The elections were to be held on 3 September 2006, but they turned out to be unnecessary as on 22 August, Barcelona confirmed Laporta's presidency for another four years after no other would-be candidate received the 1,804 signatures required to stand for the elections

Vote of No Confidence 

The poor results of the sports sections, especially in football, together with concerns about his leadership style, resulted in a censure motion which took place on 6 July 2008 and was led by Oriol Giralt. Exit polls showed that 60.60% of the 39,389 votes cast were against Laporta. Even though he lost the overall vote, however, the necessary 66% to hold new elections was not reached.

Following the results, it was speculated that Laporta would resign due to pressure from fellow directors. This would have resulted in then vice-president Albert Vicens taking over for Laporta, with Ferran Soriano replacing Vicens as the main vice-president. These rumours, however, were quickly dismissed by Laporta. On 10 July 2008, 8 of the 17 board members – vice-presidents Albert Vicens, Ferran Soriano and Marc Ingla, and directors Evarist Murtra, Toni Rovira, Xavier Cambra, Clàudia Vives-Fierro and Josep Lluís Vilaseca – resigned following Laporta's confirmation that he will stay on as president of the club despite the opinion of the members. In a press statement, they revealed that they resigned due to "discrepancies in the way to act after the result of the motion".

The return of Pep Guardiola 

After dismissing Barcelona head coach Frank Rijkaard, Laporta appointed the untested and inexperienced Pep Guardiola, Barça's team captain at the end of the "Dream Team" era. Guardiola's only experience as a coach was with the B team the previous season (which won promotion from the fourth tier to the third). Although the team started poorly, losing the first match to Numancia and drawing the second, Barcelona had the best season in its history, winning the treble of La Liga, the Copa del Rey and the Champions League. Supercopa de España and UEFA Super Cup titles followed in August, as well as a FIFA Club World Cup victory in December. He was succeeded by Sandro Rosell in 2010.

2021–2022: Second tenure as club president, a new hope  

In November 2020, Laporta announced president candidacy for the 2021 FC Barcelona presidential elections. In January 2021, he officially entered the presidential race after presenting 10,252 signatures out of which 9,625 were validated and was the favorite to win the presidential election. On 7 March, Laporta won the presidential election, in which he received 54.28% of the vote ahead of Víctor Font and Toni Freixa who received 29.99% and 8.58% of the vote respectively. He succeeded Josep Maria Bartomeu who resigned in October 2020 to avoid facing a vote of no confidence from the club members.

Political activities 

Laporta has long been involved in politics. In 1996, he joined the Independence Party, formed by Pilar Rahola and Àngel Colom, former members of the Republican Left of Catalonia.

Laporta has long held ambitions to enter Spanish politics after leaving office as president of FC Barcelona. He has in the past been outspoken about his political affiliations: he supports Catalan independence from Spain. FC Barcelona is seen by many as a symbol of Catalonia, a generally accepted fact which Laporta often emphasizes but has been criticized by those who think that Barça should remain neutral from a political standpoint.

Following the end of his second term as president, Laporta formed the independence-seeking political party Democràcia Catalana (Catalan Democracy). In the summer of 2010, Laporta's party merged with other extra-parliamentary pro-independence parties and grassroots movements into a political platform called Catalan Solidarity for Independence. Laporta was elected its president.

In the Catalan elections of 28 November 2010, the new party managed to win 4 seats in the 135-member Catalan Parliament, making it the sixth largest party out of seven. Laporta was elected in the circumscription of Barcelona.

In 2011, Laporta stepped down as president of the Catalan Solidarity for Independence and left the party.

Criticism 

Laporta's management of the sports sections of the club, especially the basketball section, has been controversial. On 2 June 2005, he faced the resignation of five members of the club's board of directors, including Sandro Rosell. They accused him of having changed for the worse as a person, having adopted authoritarian traits and harbouring ambitions of power.

In October 2005, he faced a scandal when his brother-in-law and member of the board of directors in charge of security, Alejandro Echevarría, was revealed to be a member of the Francisco Franco Foundation. After several denials by Echevarría and Laporta, contested by documents shown by a former member of the board of directors, Laporta was finally forced to accept Echevarría's resignation. Echevarría continued, however, to be close to the club and he organized the security during the celebrations of the 2005–06 La Liga championship.

Laporta's own political history added to the complications surrounding the Echevarría scandal, as his politics are diametrically opposed to those implied by Echevarría's membership of the Francisco Franco Foundation. Laporta is a self-described Catalan nationalist and has been identified on several occasions as supporting the independence of Catalonia from Spain. In the early 1990s, he and fellow Catalan politicians Pilar Rahola and Ángel Colom founded the now-defunct Partit per la independencia, which supported Catalan separatism. He was also an active participant at the controversial Frankfurt Book Fair of 2007, at which Catalan language and culture were the special featured invitees, but not including other Catalonia-based authors who wrote in other languages, such as Spanish. At the fair, Laporta stated that he "hopes that FC Barcelona continues to be a tool to promote the Catalan language and culture" and to the contrary, he would feel obligated "to create the Catalan Republic of Barcelona".

Another criticism Joan Laporta faced was coming back to his presidential chair in 2021 for FC Barcelona club, which already had big financial issues and its best football player Lionel Messi on the verge of leaving, with promises to turn the situation around and persuade Messi to stay. He failed the promise, Messi left for another club making some fans angry and upset.  Messi's exit from Barcelona led to Jaume Llopis, a former member of the Espai Barca Commission, to resign from his post stating that the club and the president did not do their all to keep the Argentine at the club.

Fraud involvement 

According to OK Diario, a leading Spanish investigative newspaper, Laporta would be implicated in a case of fraud of more than EUR 1,000,000 from a Dubai businessman together with a character of dubious reputation, Rayco Garcia Cabrera, who already committed similar crimes by forging contracts from Real Madrid and making false representations in 2015 in Oman and Tanzania.

Personal life 

Laporta was married to Constanza Echevarría and has three sons, Pol, Guillem and Jan. Laporta's son Pol is a footballer who plays as an attacking midfielder.

Trophies won by club during presidency 

La Liga
2004–05, 2005–06, 2008–09, 2009–10
Primera División (women)
2020–21, 2021–22
Copa del Rey
2008–09, 2020–21
Supercopa de España
2005, 2006, 2009, 2022-23
UEFA Champions League
2005–06, 2008–09
UEFA Women's Champions League
2020–21
UEFA Super Cup
2009
FIFA Club World Cup
2009
EHF Champions League
2020–21

References 

1962 births
Living people
Lawyers from Barcelona
FC Barcelona presidents
20th-century Spanish lawyers
Members of the Parliament of Catalonia
University of Barcelona alumni
People named in the Paradise Papers